The Bass model or Bass diffusion model was developed by Frank Bass.  It consists of a simple differential equation that describes the process of how new products get adopted in a population. The model presents a rationale of how current adopters and potential adopters of a new product interact. The basic premise of the model is that adopters can be classified as innovators or as imitators, and the speed and timing of adoption depends on their degree of innovation and the degree of imitation among adopters. The Bass model has been widely used in forecasting, especially new products' sales forecasting and technology forecasting. Mathematically, the basic Bass diffusion is a Riccati equation with constant coefficients equivalent to Verhulst--Pearl Logistic growth.

In 1969, Frank Bass published his paper on a new product growth model for consumer durables.  Prior to this, Everett Rogers published Diffusion of Innovations, a highly influential work that described the different stages of product adoption. Bass contributed some mathematical ideas to the concept.

Model formulation
 

Where:
  is the installed base fraction
  is the change of the installed base fraction, i.e.  
  is the coefficient of innovation
  is the coefficient of imitation

Expressed as an ordinary differential equation,

Sales (or new adopters)   at time  is the rate of change of installed base, i.e.,   multiplied by the ultimate market potential . Under the condition , we have that

 

The time of peak sales

Explanation
The coefficient p is called the coefficient of innovation, external influence or advertising effect.  The coefficient q is called the coefficient of imitation, internal influence or word-of-mouth effect.

Typical values of p and q when time t is measured in years:
The average value of p has been found to be 0.03, and is often less than 0.01
The average value of q has been found to be 0.38, with a typical range between 0.3 and 0.5

Derivation 
From these basic definitions in survival analysis, we know that:Therefore, the differential equation for the survival function is equivalent to:Integration and rearrangement of terms gives us that:For any survival function, we must have that  and this implies that . With this condition, the survival function is:Finally, using the fact that , we find that the Bass diffusion model for product uptake is:

Extensions to the model

Generalised Bass model (with pricing)

Bass found that his model fit the data for almost all product introductions, despite a wide range of managerial decision variables, e.g. pricing and advertising.  This means that decision variables can shift the Bass curve in time, but that the shape of the curve is always similar.

Although many extensions of the model have been proposed, only one of these reduces to the Bass model under ordinary circumstances.  This model was developed in 1994 by Frank Bass, Trichy Krishnan and Dipak Jain:

where  is a function of percentage change in price and other variables

Successive generations
Technology products succeed one another in generations.  Norton and Bass extended the model in 1987 for sales of products with continuous repeat purchasing.  The formulation for three generations is as follows: 

 
 
 

where 
 
  is the incremental number of ultimate adopters of the ith generation product
  is the average (continuous) repeat buying rate among adopters of the ith generation product
  is the time since the introduction of the ith generation product
 

It has been found that the p and q terms are generally the same between successive generations.

Relationship with other s-curves
There are two special cases of the Bass diffusion model.

The first special case occurs when q=0, when the model reduces to the exponential distribution.
The second special case reduces to the logistic distribution, when p=0.

The Bass model is a special case of the Gamma/shifted Gompertz distribution (G/SG): Bemmaor (1994)

Use in online social networks

The rapid, recent (as of early 2007) growth in online social networks (and other virtual communities) has led to an increased use of the Bass diffusion model.  The Bass diffusion model is used to estimate the size and growth rate of these social networks. The work by Christian Bauckhage and co-authors shows that the Bass model provides a more pessimistic picture of the future than alternative model(s) such as the Weibull distribution and the shifted Gompertz distribution.

Adoption of this model 
The model is one of the most cited empirical generalizations in marketing; as of February 2023 the paper "A New Product Growth for Model Consumer Durables" published in Management Science had (approximately) 11066 citations in Google Scholar. 

This model has been widely influential in marketing and management science. In 2004 it was selected as one of the ten most frequently cited papers in the 50-year history of Management Science.  It was ranked number five, and the only marketing paper in the list.  It was subsequently reprinted in the December 2004 issue of Management Science.

See also
Diffusion of innovation
Forecasting
Lazy user model
Shifted Gompertz distribution

References

External links 
 Frank M. Bass Official Website

Applied mathematics
Innovation
Market segmentation
Product lifecycle management